WHA may refer to:

Government
 World Health Assembly, the meetings of the World Health Organization (WHO)
 World Health Academy, international non-governmental organization specializing in global health
 Bureau of Western Hemisphere Affairs, within the U.S. Department of State

Sport
 World Hockey Association, a defunct major professional hockey league active from 1972 to 1979
 World Hockey Association (proposed), organization that controlled WHA Hockey interests between 2004 and 2008
 WHA Junior West Hockey League, a defunct Junior A Hockey league based out of the British Columbia/Washington area associated with the proposed WHA
 World Hockey Association 2, a defunct minor professional hockey league, tiered under the proposed WHA

Education and academia
 World History Association, academic organization
 Wallace Hall Academy, a secondary school in Thornhill, Dumfries and Galloway

Travel
 West Houston Airport, a privately owned, public use airport in Harris County, Texas.
 Whampoa station, MTR station code WHA
 Wuhan railway station, China Railway pinyin code WHA
 Wuhu Xuanzhou Airport, IATA code WHA

Media
 WHA (AM), a radio station (970 AM) licensed to Madison, Wisconsin, United States
 WHA-TV, a television station (channel 20, virtual 21) licensed to Madison, Wisconsin, United States

Other
 Tungsten Heavy Alloy, any of various alloys of tungsten (wolfram) used for their high density in applications such as kinetic energy penetrators, counterbalancers, and ballast.

See also

 
 
 WHL (disambiguation)